Trouin is a town in the Léogâne Arrondissement, in the Ouest department of Haiti.

References

Populated places in Ouest (department)